Patrick George Thomas Buchan-Hepburn, 1st Baron Hailes,  (2 April 1901 – 5 November 1974) was a British Conservative politician and the only Governor-General of the short-lived West Indies Federation from 1958 to 1962.

Background and education 

Buchan-Hepburn was the youngest son of Sir Archibald Buchan-Hepburn, 4th Baronet (see Buchan-Hepburn baronets) and his wife Edith Agnes (née Karslake). He was educated at Harrow and Trinity College, Cambridge.

Career 

Buchan-Hepburn was a personal secretary to Winston Churchill and a London County Councillor. Having stood unsuccessfully for election as a Member of Parliament (MP) in Wolverhampton East at the 1929 general election, he became MP for the East Toxteth division of Liverpool following a by-election in February 1931. In 1939, he was appointed a Parliamentary Whip for the Conservative Party and a Lord of the Treasury. During World War II, he served in the military.

Returning to politics in 1945, Buchan-Hepburn became Deputy Whip and then, in 1948, Chief Whip. He was elected MP for the newly created Beckenham constituency in Kent after his East Toxteth constituency was abolished by boundary changes before the 1950 general election. From 1951 to 1955, he was Government Chief Whip and Parliamentary Secretary to the Treasury. In 1957, he was raised to the peerage as Baron Hailes of Prestonkirk in the County of East Lothian. Lord Hailes was appointed a Knight Grand Cross of the Order of the British Empire in September 1957.

When, in 1958, the West Indies Federation was formed in response to complaints against British colonialism in the Caribbean, Lord Hailes was appointed the Federation's first Governor-General and relocated to Port of Spain on the island of Trinidad. Four years later, the new state was dissolved and he returned to England, where he served as Chairman of the Historic Buildings Council (a predecessor of English Heritage, formally known as the Historic Buildings and Monuments Commission for England).

In the 1962 Birthday Honours Lord Hailes was appointed a Companion of Honour.

Personal life 

Buchan-Hepburn married Diana Mary, daughter of Brigadier-General the Hon. Charles Lambton and war widow of Major William Hedworth Williamson, in 1945. They had no children. He was step-father to Diana's son, Sir Nicholas Frederick Hedworth Williamson, 11th Baronet.

Buchan-Hepburn died in November 1974, aged 73, whence his barony became extinct.

Footnotes

External links 
 
The Papers of Patrick George Buchan-Hepburn, 1st Baron Hailes of Prestonkirk held at Churchill Archives Centre

1901 births
1974 deaths
Alumni of Trinity College, Cambridge
British Army personnel of World War II
Colonial government in the West Indies
Colonial governors of the West Indies
Buchan-Hepburn, Patrick
Governors-general
Knights Grand Cross of the Order of the British Empire
Buchan-Hepburn, Patrick
Members of the Order of the Companions of Honour
Members of the Privy Council of the United Kingdom
Ministers in the Churchill wartime government, 1940–1945
People educated at Harrow School
Royal Artillery officers
City of London Yeomanry (Rough Riders) officers
Buchan-Hepburn, Patrick
Buchan-Hepburn, Patrick
Buchan-Hepburn, Patrick
Buchan-Hepburn, Patrick
Buchan-Hepburn, Patrick
Buchan-Hepburn, Patrick
Buchan-Hepburn, Patrick
Younger sons of baronets
Ministers in the Churchill caretaker government, 1945
Ministers in the Chamberlain wartime government, 1939–1940
Hereditary barons created by Elizabeth II
Ministers in the third Churchill government, 1951–1955
Ministers in the Eden government, 1955–1957